Blystavytsia is a village in Bucha Raion (district) in Kyiv Oblast of Ukraine. It belongs to Bucha urban hromada, one of the hromadas of Ukraine. 

Blystavytsia was previously located in Borodianka Raion. The raion was abolished on 18 July 2020 as part of the administrative reform of Ukraine, which reduced the number of raions of Kyiv Oblast to seven. The area of Borodianka Raion was merged into Bucha Raion.

References

Villages in Bucha Raion